VBI may refer to:
Biocomplexity Institute of Virginia Tech (formerly the Virginia Bioinformatics Institute), a research organization specializing in bioinformatics, computational biology, and systems biology in Virginia, United States
Value-based investing, also known as value investing,  an investment paradigm that involves buying securities that appear underpriced by some form of fundamental analysis
VBI Vaccines Inc. and  Variation Biotechnologies, related manufacturers of vaccines
Vertebrobasilar insufficiency, a temporary set of symptoms due to decreased blood flow (ischemia) in the posterior circulation of the brain
Vertical blank interrupt, a hardware feature found in some computer systems that generate a video display
vertical blanking interval, a portion of a television signal
Visible Broadband Imager, part of the Daniel K. Inouye Solar Telescope